Stathmonotus is a genus of chaenopsid blennies found in the Pacific and Atlantic oceans.

Species
There are currently seven recognized species in this genus:
 Stathmonotus culebrai Seale, 1940 (Panamanian worm blenny)
 Stathmonotus gymnodermis V. G. Springer, 1955 (Naked blenny)
 Stathmonotus hemphillii T. H. Bean, 1885 (Blackbelly blenny)
 Stathmonotus lugubris J. E. Böhlke, 1953 (Mexican worm blenny)
 Stathmonotus sinuscalifornici (Chabanaud, 1942) (California worm blenny)
 Stathmonotus stahli (Evermann & M. C. Marsh, 1899) (Eelgrass blenny)
 Stathmonotus tekla Nichols, 1910

References

 
Chaenopsidae
Marine fish genera
Taxa named by Tarleton Hoffman Bean